Vice Admiral Richard Bell Davies  (19 May 1886 – 26 February 1966), also known as Richard Bell-Davies, was a senior Royal Navy commander, naval aviator, and a First World War recipient of the Victoria Cross, the highest award for gallantry in the face of the enemy that can be awarded to British and Commonwealth forces.

Early life and career
Born in Kensington, London, Davies was orphaned by the age of five and was brought up by an uncle, a doctor. He attended Bradfield College in Berkshire between September 1899 and April 1901. Davies enlisted in the Royal Navy in 1901 joining , and on 15 September 1902 was posted as a naval cadet to the protected cruiser HMS Diana, serving with the Mediterranean Fleet. In 1910 he took private flying lessons, and in 1913 he was accepted into the Royal Naval Air Service (RNAS) and was appointed a squadron commander.

First World War

Distinguished Service Order
In the early days of the war, Davies and Richard Peirse carried out a number of raids on German submarine bases at Ostend and Zeebrugge. Both were awarded the DSO:

Victoria Cross
Davies was then posted to the Dardanelles, and was awarded the Victoria Cross on 1 January 1916 for an action at Ferrijik Junction, in Bulgaria near the border with Ottoman-controlled Europe, on 19 November 1915. He was 29 years old, and in command of No. 3 Squadron RNAS. His citation read:

This was the first combat search and rescue by aircraft in history. Like later search and rescue efforts, Davies' action sprang from the desire to keep a compatriot from capture or death at the hands of the enemy; unlike most of those future efforts, it was a one-man impromptu action that succeeded because of a peculiarity in construction of his aircraft. The Nieuport 10 he was flying was a single seat model which had had its front cockpit decked over. When Davies picked him up under rifle fire, Smylie wriggled past Davies and through his controls into the tiny roofed-over front compartment. Smylie was so thoroughly wedged among the controls that, upon landing, it took two hours to extricate him.

Davies was also mentioned in despatches for his Gallipoli service.

In early 1916 Davies was transferred to the Western Front, conducting bombing raids behind German lines, and then as wing commander in the seaplane carrier HMS Campania, attached to the Grand Fleet. He remained with the Royal Navy when in April 1918 the RNAS was incorporated into the Royal Air Force. At the end of the war he was awarded the Air Force Cross and the French Croix de guerre with Palm.

Interbellum and Second World War
He was promoted to captain in 1926 and was again in charge of the Air Section of the Naval Staff 1926–28.

He was Chief Staff Officer to the Rear Admiral commanding 1st Cruiser Squadron in the Mediterranean 1929–30, and Liaison Officer for the Fleet Air Arm at the Air Ministry 1931–33. He commanded  on the China station 1933–35 and the naval base at Devonport (HMS Drake) 1936–38. He was promoted to rear admiral in 1938 and from 1939 to 1941 was Rear Admiral, Naval Air Stations, based at RNAS Lee-on-Solent (HMS Daedalus). He was appointed a Companion of the Order of the Bath in the King's Birthday Honours of 1939.

Davies was promoted to vice admiral upon retiring on 29 May 1941, aged 55. He then joined the Royal Naval Reserve (RNR) with a reduction in rank to commander. As an RNR officer, he served as a convoy commodore, and as commissioning captain of the escort carrier  and the trials carrier . He left the RNR in 1944.

Death and legacy
He died at RNH Haslar in Gosport, Hampshire. His Victoria Cross is on display at the Fleet Air Arm Museum in Yeovil, Somerset.

On 19 November 2015, he was remembered at a memorial service in central London, with a memorial stone laid in Sloane Square, Chelsea.

See also

List of firsts in aviation

References
Footnotes

Sources

Further reading

External links

Location of grave and VC medal (Hampshire)
 
Royal Navy (RN) Officers 1939–1945

1886 births
1966 deaths
People from Kensington
British World War I recipients of the Victoria Cross
Companions of the Order of the Bath
Royal Naval Air Service aviators
Companions of the Distinguished Service Order
Royal Navy admirals of World War II
Recipients of the Air Force Cross (United Kingdom)
Recipients of the Croix de Guerre 1914–1918 (France)
Royal Navy recipients of the Victoria Cross
Military personnel from London
Recipients of the Order of Michael the Brave
Royal Naval Reserve personnel